José Manuel Gutiérrez Guerra, known as "the last Oligarch," (5 September 1869, in Sucre, Bolivia – 3 February 1929, in Antofagasta, Chile) was a Bolivian economist and statesman who served as the 28th president of Bolivia from 1917 to 1920. He was the grandson of Pedro José Domingo de Guerra, acting president in 1879, a man of high integrity and chief justice of the Supreme Court, who had died in office after he was forced to assume presidential responsibilities during the disastrous War of the Pacific.

Early life and family 
The scion of two illustrious aristocratic families from Chuquisaca, which traced descent from Incan royalty, the first Spanish conquistadors who came into Peru and eminent judges of the Audiencia of Charcas, on his mother's side, he was also related to Irish physician Francis Rynd and British statesman Lord Palmerston. He was sent to England at an early age to receive the best education possible. There, he studied under the Jesuits at Stonyhurst College, later at St Bede's College, and then at Merton College, Oxford, from where he graduated in 1890, aged 21.

He returned to Bolivia, where he worked in banking. An economist by training, he entered politics almost against his will. As one contemporary put it, "He never sought political preferment." In 1914, he was elected to Congress as deputy from La Paz. His rise was meteoric, however, as he was tipped to succeed Ismael Montes as Liberal party candidate in the 1917 presidential elections.

Presidency 

Having won at the polls, he took office but faced severe problems stemming from worsening economic conditions and mounting opposition from the recently formed Republican party. The 1917 assassination (never fully explained) of the founder of that party and former president, José Manuel Pando, further undermined Gutiérrez's popularity. Worse, he failed to act decisively from the point of view of his opponents, despite his call on Congress to launch an official investigation into the alleged excesses and misdeeds of his predecessor and political chief, Ismael Montes. Twenty-plus years of unbroken Liberal control of the government (the longest by one party in the history of Bolivia) had fatigued most Bolivians and turned them against the ruling elites and their methods, and earned the red-bearded, green-eyed head of state of this Andean nation, where the majority of people are Indian, the nickname "the last Oligarch."

All of this culminated in the 1920 coup d'état which, with military help, brought to power the opposition Republican party under the leadership of Bautista Saavedra. Gutierrez-Guerra sought refuge in the United States legation at La Paz and went on to take a banking position at New York-based Chase National. He lived the rest of his days in exile, dying in Antofagasta, Chile in 1929.

Works under his government 
During his government, several works were undertaken, among which it is worth highlighting:

 Oil exploitation began in the departments of Chuquisaca, Santa Cruz and Tarija, deposits given in concession to the American company Richmond Levering Co.
 The Beni drinking water service was inaugurated and the contract for the construction of the sewage systems for the cities of La Paz and Cochabamba was signed.
 The Escuela Nacional de Bolívar de Oruro and Florida de Santa Cruz de la Sierra were built.
 The Military Aviation School was founded in el Alto de La Paz (1920).
 The Mineralogical Museum of Oruro was inaugurated.
 In the context of the First World War, Bolivia declared war on the German Empire.

Among his few and least valued works was the tax on fraud committed by the company of Simón I. Patiño for the smuggling of 10,000 cans of alcohol from Peru, which caused economic damage to the state. It was due to this fact that the tin tycoon was separated from the liberal party. Because of this scandal, Gutiérrez would lose popularity and eventually the presidency. Having been the first president to fine the largest tin magnate in the world, who brazenly embezzled from the general treasury of the nation, enriching himself at the expense of the lives of thousands of disenfranchised mining workers, Gutiérrez lost all remaining support from the country's elite. His overthrow in 1920 was very simple, as he had alienated himself almost completely.

References

Sources 
 Parker, William Belmont, Bolivians of to-day, pp. 141–144 Hispanic Society of America (2nd ed., 1922) (full text)
 Benavides, Julio M., José Gutiérrez Guerra en nuestra historia económica (1975)
 Urioste, Ovidio Mi historia anecdótica de Bolivia (1951)
 

1869 births
1929 deaths
20th-century Bolivian politicians
Alumni of Merton College, Oxford
Bolivian economists
Bolivian exiles
Bolivian expatriates in Chile
Bolivian people of Irish descent
Bolivian people of Spanish descent
Candidates in the 1917 Bolivian presidential election
Leaders ousted by a coup
Liberal Party (Bolivia) politicians
Members of the Chamber of Deputies (Bolivia)
Finance ministers of Bolivia
People educated at St Bede's College, Manchester
People from Sucre
Presidents of Bolivia
Presidents of the Chamber of Deputies (Bolivia)